PTD may refer to:
Participatory technology development, learning and innovation in international sustainable agriculture programs
Partido de los Trabajadores Dominicanos (Dominican Workers' Party), a political party in the Dominican Republic
Pathfinder Technology Demonstrator, a NASA project using CubeSats
Peak–trough difference, the difference between the maximal and minimal values of an oscillating curve
Permanent total disability in insurance
Poloidal–toroidal decomposition, a technique in mathematics for representing solenoidal vector fields 
Post-travel depression, alternate term for post-vacation blues
Pre-term delivery, alternate term for preterm birth, of a baby of less than 37 weeks gestational age
Pre-Thread Data file, an element of the Microsoft .NET Framework
Pre-trial diversion in criminal justice
Prevention through design, method for mitigating occupational hazards

Protected trust deed in Scottish bankruptcy law
PTD, FAA location identifier for Potsdam Municipal Airport in New York state
PTD-DBM, Protein Transduction Domain-fused Dishevelled Binding Motif